Gino Mauro Padula (born 11 July 1976) is an Argentine former professional footballer who played as a left back.

Career
Born in Lanús, Padula played in Argentina, Spain, England, France and the United States. He started his career in the esteemed River Plate system, but achieved highest accolades while at Queens Park Rangers and Columbus Crew.

Early career in England
Padula first moved to England when he joined Bristol Rovers in 1999, however he only joined on trial and didn't make an appearance for them. He then moved on to Walsall for whom he made 27 appearances in 1999–2000, and was voted their player of the season. However at the end of the season Walsall were relegated. Padula signed for Wigan Athletic in 2000, and at Wigan he scored his first goal in English football in a Football League Trophy tie against his former club Walsall.

Queens Park Rangers
After leaving Wigan in 2001 and spending a year in Argentina his most successful spell came at QPR, where he became somewhat of a cult hero. Padula was signed in 2002 by then QPR manager Ian Holloway who he had worked with during his spell at Bristol Rovers. He initially found it hard to break into the first team. Padula made his debut for the club as a substitute against Barnsley on 17 August 2002. His first start for QPR came on 2 November 2002 against Port Vale, however in the first half goalkeeper Simon Royce was sent off and substitute goalkeeper Fraser Digby was brought on for Padula. He eventually got his chance due to injuries from January 2003, and he finally started to display his tough slide tackling and steely determination. Padula became an overnight fan-favourite and one of the first names on the team sheet. As his confidence grew, he became more and more attacking and his prowess from dead balls became legendary with the QPR faithful. He scored his first goal for the club against Port Vale, the same team he was disappointingly substituted off against months earlier.

Padula helped QPR to the 2003 Division Two playoff final which he started and performed solidly against Cardiff City at the Millennium Stadium. He was withdrawn in the 79th minute, being replaced by Tommy Williams. QPR lost the game one nil after extra time. The following season, Padula started 36 league games for QPR and scored 3 goals. QPR finished second only to Plymouth and won promotion back to the second tier of English football, the newly renamed Championship. Upon winning promotion on the final day of the season, beating Sheffield Wednesday 3-1 at Hillsborough, Padula danced in front of the 8000 travelling QPR fans, holding an Argentina flag.

He remains one of the most popular modern-era QPR characters.

Columbus Crew
Padula and fellow Argentine, Guillermo Barros Schelotto, helped lead the Columbus Crew to the 2008 MLS Supporters Shield and 2008 MLS Cup. They repeated as Supporters' Shield winners in 2009.

Coaching

Following his retirement in 2011, he established Sporting Padula Soccer Academy in Westerville, Ohio, spsocceracademy.com. Padula has been certified to coach by FIFA and holds an "A" license.

Honors
Columbus Crew
Major League Soccer MLS Cup: 2008
Major League Soccer Supporters Shield: 2008, 2009
Major League Soccer Eastern Conference Playoffs: 2008
Major League Soccer Eastern Conference Season: 2008, 2009

Individual
PFA Team of the Year: 2003–04 Second Division

References

1976 births
Living people
Sportspeople from Lanús
Argentine footballers
Association football fullbacks
Club Atlético River Plate footballers
Club Atlético Huracán footballers
Xerez CD footballers
Bristol Rovers F.C. players
Walsall F.C. players
Wigan Athletic F.C. players
Queens Park Rangers F.C. players
Nottingham Forest F.C. players
Montpellier HSC players
Columbus Crew players
Argentine Primera División players
Segunda División players
English Football League players
Ligue 2 players
Major League Soccer players
Argentine expatriate footballers
Expatriate footballers in Spain
Expatriate footballers in England
Expatriate footballers in France
Expatriate soccer players in the United States
Argentine expatriate sportspeople in Spain
Argentine expatriate sportspeople in England
Argentine expatriate sportspeople in France
Argentine expatriate sportspeople in the United States